Burchert is a German language surname. It stems from the male given name Burchard – and may refer to:
Nico Burchert (1987), retired German footballer
Sascha Burchert (1989), German professional footballer

References

German-language surnames
Surnames from given names